KNXN (1470 AM) is a radio station licensed to Sierra Vista, Arizona, United States. The station currently simulcasts KGMS 940 AM's Christian talk format, in order to expand that station's coverage to the southeast of Tucson.

History

KNXN originated with a 1978 application to build a new station on 1470 kHz in Sierra Vista, that was granted the next year.

The station was assigned the call letters KSVA on March 31, 1980, and began regular broadcasting the following June 20th. The call sign changed to KMFI on August 1, 1987, and to KNXN on November 8, 1993.

References

External links

 FCC History Cards for KNXN (covering 1978–1981 as KSVA)

Radio stations established in 1980
NXN
1980 establishments in Arizona